Decaprenylphospho-beta-D-ribofuranose 2-oxidase (decaprenylphosphoryl-beta-D-ribofuranose 2'-epimerase, Rv3790, DprE1) is an enzyme with systematic name trans,octacis-decaprenylphospho-beta-D-ribofuranose:FAD 2-oxidoreductase. This enzyme catalyses the following chemical reaction

 trans,octacis-decaprenylphospho-beta-D-ribofuranose + FAD  trans,octacis-decaprenylphospho-beta-D-erythro-pentofuranosid-2-ulose + FADH2

This enzyme from the bacterium Mycobacterium smegmatis participates in epimerization of trans,octacis-decaprenylphospho-beta-D-ribofuranose to trans,octacis-decaprenylphospho-beta-D-arabinoofuranose.

References

External links 
 

EC 1.1.98